The 2021 Open de Rennes was a professional tennis tournament played on hard courts. It was the fifteenth edition of the tournament and part of the 2021 ATP Challenger Tour. It took place in Rennes, France between 13 and 19 September 2021.

Singles main-draw entrants

Seeds

1 Rankings are as of 30 August 2021.

Other entrants
The following players received wildcards into the singles main draw:
  Kyrian Jacquet
  Harold Mayot
  Andy Murray

The following player received entry into the singles main draw as an alternate:
  Teymuraz Gabashvili

The following players received entry from the qualifying draw:
  Alessandro Bega
  Clément Chidekh
  Manuel Guinard
  Calvin Hemery

The following players received entry as lucky losers:
  Dan Added
  Mats Rosenkranz

Champions

Singles

 Benjamin Bonzi def.  Mats Moraing 7–6(7–3), 7–6(7–3).

Doubles

 Bart Stevens /  Tim van Rijthoven def.  Marek Gengel /  Tomáš Macháč 6–7(2–7), 7–5, [10–3].

References

2021
2021 ATP Challenger Tour
2021 in French tennis
September 2021 sports events in France